Hye-in is a Korean feminine given name. Its meaning differs based on the hanja used to write each syllable of the name. There are 16 hanja with the reading "hye" and 29 hanja with the reading "in" on the South Korean government's official list of hanja which may be registered for use in given names. Hye-in in Sino Korean 惠 means "favor, benefit, confer kindness" and 仁 "humaneness, benevolence, kindness".

People with this name include:
Yong Hyein (born 1990), South Korean civil society activist
Jung Seol-bin (born Jung Hye-in, 1990), South Korean football forward
Choi Hye-in (born 1992), South Korean badminton player 
Heyne (singer) (born Kim Hye-in, 1992), South Korean singer
Kim Hye-in (born 1993), South Korean actress
Yoon Hye-in (born 1994), South Korean singer, member of disbanded girl group Puretty
Lee Hye-in (born 1995), South Korean actress
Hye-in (born 2008), South Korean singer, member of the girl group NewJeans

Fictional characters with this name include:
Yoon Hye-in, in 2010 South Korean television series Athena: Goddess of War
Lee Hye-in and Ri Hye-in, in 2013 South Korean film Commitment

See also
List of Korean given names

References

Korean feminine given names